Spiridon Stais was a Greek sport shooter. He competed at the 1896 Summer Olympics in Athens. Theofilakis competed in the military rifle event.  He tied for twelfth place with Eugen Schmidt at 845 points.

References

External links

Year of birth missing
Year of death missing
Greek male sport shooters
Olympic shooters of Greece
Shooters at the 1896 Summer Olympics
19th-century sportsmen
Place of birth missing
Place of death missing